Yuriy Volodymyrovych Koval (born July 15, 1980 in Odessa) is an amateur Ukrainian Greco-Roman wrestler, who played for the men's featherweight category. Koval represented Ukraine at the 2008 Summer Olympics in Beijing, where he competed for the men's 55 kg class. He lost the qualifying round match to Serbia's Kristijan Fris, with a three-set technical score (4–6, 2–1, 1–3), and a classification point score of 1–3.

References

External links
 
 

Ukrainian male sport wrestlers
1980 births
Living people
Olympic wrestlers of Ukraine
Wrestlers at the 2008 Summer Olympics
Sportspeople from Odesa
21st-century Ukrainian people